The 2020 GT Sports Club America is the inaugural season of the SRO Motorsports Group's GT Sports Club America, an auto racing series for grand tourer cars. GT Sports Club America is a championship for Bronze, Titanium and Iron drivers only. The Titanium categorisation is within the Bronze category, for drivers between the age of 50 and 59. The Iron categorisation is within the Bronze category, for drivers over the age of 60. The races are contested with GT2-spec and GT3-spec cars. The season began on 11 July at Virginia and will end on 3 October at Indianapolis.

Calendar
At the annual press conference during the 2019 24 Hours of Spa on 26 July, the Stéphane Ratel Organisation announced the 2020 calendar.
Calendar changes due to COVID-19 pandemic
The season opening round at Virginia was moved from 6–7 June to 11–12 July.

Entry list

Race results

Championship standings
Scoring system
Championship points are awarded for the first ten positions in each race. Entries are required to complete 75% of the winning car's race distance in order to be classified and earn points.

Drivers' championships

Overall

Titanium Cup

Iron Cup

See also
2020 GT World Challenge America
2020 GT World Challenge Europe Sprint Cup

References

External links

GT Sports Club America